D-glucuronyl C5-epimerase is an enzyme that in humans is encoded by the GLCE gene.

References

Further reading